Perak state route A151 or Jalan Sultan Abdullah is a state road in Teluk Intan, Perak, Malaysia starting from the traffic lights crossroad at 58 Jalan Changkat Jong and Jalan Jawa to the traffic lights junction at A147 Jalan Padang Tembak.

It used to be a two-lane road that provides access to many housing areas situated off the road. However, due to the increasing number of housing areas off the road, traffic volume increased tremendously and there were cases of fatal accidents along this road.

A project to upgrade this route into a four-lane dual carriageway was initiated in 2001 and completed in 2003. The upgraded road introduced three new traffic lights crossroads at:
 Jalan Mustapaha Al Bakri and Jalan Manggis
 Jalan Merbok
 Jalan Kempas

List of key points along Jalan Sultan Abdullah, Teluk Intan

References 

Sultan Abdullah, Teluk Intan